Kevin Sullivan, American artist (born 1964), lives and works in Los Angeles, California.

Education 
His early education was in California's public school system, including Homestead High School (Cupertino, California). A cartoonist for the Homestead Epitaph who was successful enough to eventually attend University of California, Los Angeles (UCLA) where his interest in the fine arts intensified and was encouraged by UCLA School of the Arts and Architecture professors Paul McCarthy and Don Suggs. McCarthy's support helped earn him UCLA's Clifton Webb Award for his achievement in performance art. Sullivan earned a Bachelor of Arts degree from UCLA in 1988.

Background 
Performance art, painting and writing continue to be his primary pursuits. Since 1984, he has enacted approximately 24 documented performances and eight solo exhibitions, and has been included in several dozen group exhibitions throughout the United States and in Europe. Art critic David Pagel has noted Sullivan's focus on "the potential significance of mundane events and apparently unremarkable occurrences". His subjects are often the neglected and abused cultural achievements of the past. His projects include Towards an Ape Theatre (2016), old taco bells (2014), This is Bruxism (2000), The Revolutionist (1998), Residuum (1991) and The Diaries of Paul Varnac (1988). In 1990, he curated the exhibition Frontier Tales with Jan Tumlir for Los Angeles Contemporary Exhibitions (LACE) which included the work of Clive Barker, Russell Crotty, Sandy Hubshman, Daniel Johnston, Gina Lamb, Joan Mahony, Craig Stecyk and Kamar Uwais. He has published three artist books, and his critical writing on art, music and film has appeared in the magazines Dirt, Raygun, Visions, Xtra and the transfixion blogspot , often under the name Sidral Mundet (a brand of Mexican soda pop).

Career 
During the early 1990s, Sullivan was represented by Sue Spaid Fine Art in Los Angeles and Jose Freire Fine Art in New York and had some measure of conventional success, primarily with the series Residuum : paintings based on old rock and roll album covers that focused on the materiality and artistic sophistication of those objects. The series earned the artist critical acclaim from numerous periodicals, including Art in America, The New York Times, The San Francisco Examiner and The Atlanta Journal-Constitution, as well as the active interest of several collectors and curators. Sullivan's paintings Raw Power and Mayonnaise (1991) and Paranoid Gatefold with Grape Jelly (1993) were both prominently featured in the traveling exhibition and Prestal-Verlag catalog It's Only Rock and Roll, curated by David S. Rubin in 1995. Sullivan has been described as "an artist whose love/hate fanaticism for rock has gotten totally out of control", while his technical abilities as a painter have been called "experienced". His ability to "meticulously reproduce the tatters, jelly stains and doodles that these objects accrued" has been widely noted, but by 1995 he was no longer interested in appropriation or rock and roll as subject matter.

Sullivan left the galleries in 1996, unable to find support for his performance-related work. In the late 1990s he continued showing in primarily artist-run exhibitions, while also playing electric bass for the pop/rock group Maw and Paw. In 1996, he married Zazu Faure, designer, toy maker and daughter of Los Angeles art dealer Patricia Faure. By 1998 his artwork became more overtly political, evidenced by his performance related short film The Revolutionist (1998), which found critical support in curator Michael Darling who included it in his contribution to Performance Festival Odense in Denmark in 1999. According to Darling, "The Revolutionist combines a colonial, expansionist narrative with the distinctively retrogressive characters from Planet of the Apes to make an allegorical work propelled by ambiguous historical dynamics."

In 2002, Sullivan founded 401K, a company dedicated to architectural and cultural preservation that also oversees his book publications. He continues with live performance, generally in public spaces and often prompted by his writing and drawing. In 2016, he performed a reading of his essay Towards an Ape Theatre parts I-V on the streets of The Pasadena Playhouse District, exploring the relationship between Planet of the Apes, the radical theatre of Antonin Artaud and Jerzy Grotowski, Shakespeare and opera.

During 2017 Sullivan formed the conceptual art rock and roll group The Simian Racket, while defining art rock and roll as a unique social/musical phenomena with beginnings in England's The Who. Sullivan emphasizes Pete Townshend's direct connection to performance artists Gustav Metzger and Raphael Montanez Ortiz, and The Who's 1965 proclamation that they were an "auto-destructive group;" a term and concept borrowed from Townshend's art instructor Metzger.

After leading numerous experiments in impromptu musical collaboration with unsuspecting participants, permanent members of The Simian Racket now include Bongo Carlos and Ruby Lark with Sullivan performing as Stitch Jerkins.

In 2018 Sullivan was invited to participate in the 9th Internationale Waldkunstpfad in Darmstadt, Germany; a three week scholarship/residency consisting of symposiums, lectures, installations and performances in the Darmstadt forest, all conducted under the theme of Kunstokologie (Art Ecology). For the Waldkunstphad (Forest Art Path), Sullivan enacted "Towards an Ape Theatre part VI: The Simian Racket", four distinct performance events, some lasting up to three hours, and consisting of readings, impromptu dialog and a non-electric form of rock and roll played on instruments built from forest materials and refuse.

References

External links
thisisbruxism.com

Living people
American artists
1964 births